Thetford was a constituency of the British House of Commons. It elected two Members of Parliament (MPs) by the bloc vote system of election. It was disenfranchised under the Representation of the People (Scotland) Act 1868, which had resulted in a net increase of seven seats in Scotland, offset by the disenfranchisement of seven English Boroughs.

Below are those MPs who held the seat from just prior to the Restoration onwards.

Members of Parliament

MPs 1529–1660

MPs 1660–1868

FitzRoy family
Due to the town's close proximity to Euston Hall (the main residence of the FitzRoy family), the seat for Thetford has been held by various members of the family:

1733-54 & 1774-82: Charles FitzRoy-Scudamore
1739-41: Lord Augustus FitzRoy
1774-80: Hon. Charles FitzRoy
1782-84: George FitzRoy, Earl of Euston
1806-12: Lord William FitzRoy
1812-18: Lord John FitzRoy
1818-30: Lord Charles FitzRoy
1830-34: Lord James FitzRoy
1847-63: William FitzRoy, Earl of Euston
1863-65: Lord Frederick FitzRoy

Election results

Elections in the 1830s

FitzRoy's death caused a by-election.

Elections in the 1840s

Due to the triple return, on petition, one vote was knocked off FitzRoy's total and Flower was declared elected in 1842.

Baring was appointed Paymaster General, requiring a by-election.

Baring succeeded to the peerage, becoming 2nd Baron Ashburton and causing a by-election.

Elections in the 1850s

Baring resigned, causing a by-election.

Elections in the 1860s
FitzRoy succeeded to the peerage, becoming 6th Duke of Grafton and causing a by-election.

 

Baring resigned, causing a by-election.

References

Sources 
D. Brunton & D. H. Pennington, Members of the Long Parliament (London: George Allen & Unwin, 1954)
Cobbett's Parliamentary history of England, from the Norman Conquest in 1066 to the year 1803 (London: Thomas Hansard, 1808) 

Parliamentary constituencies in Norfolk (historic)
Constituencies of the Parliament of the United Kingdom established in 1529
Constituencies of the Parliament of the United Kingdom disestablished in 1868